John Nelson Brandenburg (April 29, 1929 – January 14, 2020) was a lieutenant general in the United States Army. He was commander of I Corps at Fort Lewis from 1981 to 1984. He was also a commander of the 101st Airborne Division (1978–1980).

Brandenburg died at his home in Canton, Georgia, on January 14, 2020. He was 90.

References

1929 births
2020 deaths
United States Army personnel of the Korean War
United States Army personnel of the Vietnam War
Military personnel from Enid, Oklahoma
Recipients of the Distinguished Flying Cross (United States)
Recipients of the Distinguished Service Medal (US Army)
Recipients of the Legion of Merit
Recipients of the Silver Star
United States Army generals